Ixodes minor is a species of tick in the genus Ixodes. Some reported hosts are:
Cardinalis cardinalis (Georgia)
Seiurus noveboracensis (Georgia)
Thryothorus ludovicianus (Georgia)
Zonotrichia albicollis (Georgia)
Troglodytes aedon (Georgia)
Oryzomys palustris (South Carolina)
Peromyscus gossypinus (Georgia)

See also
List of parasites of the marsh rice rat

References

Literature cited
Clark, K.L., Oliver, J.H., Jr., Grego, J.M., James, A.M., Durden, L.A. and Banks, C.W. 2001. Host associations of ticks parasitizing rodents at Borrelia burgdorferi enzootic sites in South Carolina (subscription required). Journal of Parasitology 87(6):1379–1386.
Wilson, N. and Durden, L.A. 2003. Ectoparasites of terrestrial vertebrates inhabiting the Georgia Barrier Islands, USA: an inventory and preliminary biogeographical analysis (subscription required). Journal of Biogeography 30(8):1207–1220.

minor
Endemic fauna of Georgia (U.S. state)
Animals described in 1902